Peter Wilson (25 November 1904 – 13 February 1983) was a Scottish football player and manager.

Born in Beith in Cunninghame (North Ayrshire), Wilson played for Celtic, Hibernian and the Scotland national football team. With Celtic he won four Scottish Cup medals in 1925, 1927, 1931 and 1933 and one Scottish league medal in 1933. He later became player-manager of Dunfermline Athletic and a coach at Kilmarnock.

References

1904 births
1983 deaths
Footballers from North Ayrshire
Scottish footballers
Association football wing halves
Celtic F.C. players
Beith F.C. players
Dunfermline Athletic F.C. players
Hibernian F.C. players
Scottish Football League players
Scottish Football League representative players
Scotland international footballers
Scottish football managers
Dunfermline Athletic F.C. managers
Kilmarnock F.C. non-playing staff
Scottish Football League managers
Association football player-managers
People from Beith